The 1993 Australian FAI IndyCar Grand Prix was the opening round of the 1993 CART World Series season, held on 21 March 1993 on the Surfers Paradise Street Circuit, Australia. Mansell also became the first person to win their first IndyCar race since Graham Hill had won the 1966 Indianapolis 500.

Due to the appearance of Mansell in the CART World Series, over 800 press passes were given out by the race organisers. This was second only in number for the series to the amount of press at the Indianapolis 500.

Qualifying results

Race

Notes 

 Average Speed 97.284 mph

External links
 Full Weekend Times & Results

Australian FAI IndyCar Grand Prix
FAI IndyCar Grand Prix
Gold Coast Indy 300
March 1993 sports events in Australia